Abasse Ndione (born 16 December 1946) is a Senegalese author and nurse.

Life
Ndione was born 16 December 1946 in the village of Bargny, close to Dakar, the son of a shopkeeper. He attended the local Koranic school at first; then, with pressure from his father, he and his brother attended French school.  He studied nursing and got his first job in 1966, staying in this profession until his retirement. In 1968 he married Meriem, a teacher; they have seven children. He lives in Rufisque, a fishing town about 20 kilometers from Dakar. The New African said of him, "It would be safe to bet that Abasse Ndione has seldom earned more than a pittance from any publisher. So he has made his living working full time as a hospital nurse."

Work
It took eight years for Ndione's first novel, La Vie en spirale (Life in a Spiral), to be released in Senegal. It discusses the use and trafficking of "yamba" (marijuana) by unemployed youth, police officers and whites in Senegal, discussing yamba as a social metaphor. It caused a stir and attracted the attention of the Parisian publishing house Éditions Gallimard, who published it in 1998. It is now studied in Senegal schools.

Ndione's novel Ramata (2000) was also translated into Spanish. It tells of a beautiful and wealthy Senegalese woman who, aged 50, discovers the pleasures of the flesh in the arms of a little thug 25 years younger, causing her life to unravel.
Ramata was the basis for a 2007 feature-length film directed by Léandre-Alain Baker, starring the model Katoucha Niane in the title role.
Ndione's latest work, the novella Mbëke mi, describes the emigration of young Senegalese in pirogues trying to reach the Canary Islands and Europe.
His novels show that Ndione thinks first in Wolof and then transcribes into French.

Bibliography
A selective list, with dates for publication in France:
1984 – La Vie en spirale, première partie sortie de presses en 1984 au Sénégal
1988 – La Vie en spirale II aux Nouvelles Editions Africaines, second volet
1998 – La Vie en spirale, Gallimard
2000 – Ramata, Gallimard
2008 – Mbëkë mi, Gallimard

References

Living people
1946 births
Senegalese novelists
Male nurses
Male novelists
People from Thiès Region
20th-century novelists
21st-century novelists
20th-century male writers
21st-century male writers